China Information (subtitled A Journal on Contemporary China Studies) is a triannual peer-reviewed academic journal that was established in 1986. It was originally published by the Documentation and Research Centre for Contemporary China (Leiden University), but since 2004 it has been published by SAGE Publications. The founding editor-in-chief was Woei Lien Chong. The journal has been under the editorship of Tak-Wing Ngo (University of Macao) since 2002. It covers Chinese studies in the widest sense.

Abstracting and indexing 
The journal is abstracted and indexed in:

External links 

 

Triannual journals
English-language journals
Chinese studies journals
SAGE Publishing academic journals
Publications established in 1986